Frederick John Elgersma (born July 9, 1957), known by the stage name Fred Eaglesmith, is a Canadian alternative country singer-songwriter. He is known for writing songs about vehicles, rural life, down-and-out characters, lost love and quirky rural folk. His songwriting uses techniques of short story writing, including unreliable narrators, surprise endings, and plot twists.  In 2016, Eaglesmith toured extensively with his band.

Early life
Eaglesmith, one of nine children, was raised by a farming family near Guelph in rural Southern Ontario. He began playing the guitar at age 12.

Career

As a teenager Eaglesmith hopped a freight train to Western Canada and began writing songs and performing.

Eaglesmith founded a band known as the Smokin' Losers. He later formed a group called as both the Flying Squirrels and the Flathead Noodlers, switching the name to represent different styles of music. The Flathead Noodlers play bluegrass, while the Flying Squirrels play more folk and rock. His first self-titled album was released in 1980.

Eaglesmith appeared in a 2001 television movie, The Gift.

A typical Fred Eaglesmith show includes his music set between several lengthy between-song comic monologues by Eaglesmith. Topics in the past have included stories about crossing the U.S.–Canada border, Newfoundlanders, and some friends from an Indian reserve. His fans are known as "Fredheads", a nod to deadheads, who followed the Grateful Dead. He is known to tour extensively throughout Canada and the U.S.

When Eaglesmith appears in solo performances, he bills himself as Fred J. Eaglesmith. In addition to his own albums, he frequently collaborated with the late Willie P. Bennett, a former member of Eaglesmith's band, who stepped down after a heart attack in early 2007. Eaglesmith publishes his own records.

In 2010, Eaglesmith was featured on the Late Show with David Letterman as the musical guest. He performed "Careless" from the album Cha Cha Cha.

Starting 2012, performances were billed as the Fred Eaglesmith Travelling Steam Show and include opening songs performed by Bill Poss, The Ginn Sisters, and Tif Ginn.

Fred co-wrote Tif's self-titled 2012 album with her, and the pair married in 2014. The backing band was disbanded in 2016 and they have been touring together as a duo since.

Eaglesmith's songs have been included in the musical play, Dear Johnny Deere. The play was performed at the Charlottetown Festival in 2013. Tif co-produced and mixed Fred's 2017 album, Standard.

Band members

Fred's backing musicians sometimes use band names, which have included The Flying Squirrels, The Smoking Losers – who also performed in a bluegrass formation as The Flathead Noodlers, and The Fred Eaglesmith Travelling Steam Show. He retired the band in 2016 and has been touring as a duo with Tif Ginn ever since.

Current members
Fred J. Eaglesmith – guitars, vocals
Tiffani Ginn  – vocals, accordion, guitar, melodica, mandolin, ukulele, stand up bass, percussion

Former members
David Essig – mandolin, guitar
Scott Merritt – guitar, multiple instruments
Willie P. Bennett – mandolin, harmonica, vocals 
Washboard Hank – washboard, dobro
Ralph Schipper – bass, vocals
Justine Fischer – bass
Darcy Yates – bass, vocals
Luke Stackhouse – bass, vocals
Bruce Aitken – drums
Skip Wamsteeker – drums
Jude Waldman – drums
Kevin Komatsu – drums
Kori Heppner – drums 
John P. Allen – fiddle
Craig Bignell – banjo, vocals, percussion
Roger Marin, Jr. – pedal steel, guitar, vocals
Dan Walsh – dobro, guitar, vocals
Matty Simpson – guitar, banjo, vocals
Mike Zinger – mandolin, banjo
Brit Ginn – vocals, flute

Discography

Albums
 Fred J. Eaglesmith (1980) as Fred J. Eaglesmith
 The Boy That Just Went Wrong (1983) as Fred J. Eaglesmith
 Indiana Road (1987) as Fred J. Eaglesmith
 There Ain't No Easy Road (1992) as Fred J. Eaglesmith & The Flying Squirrels  
 Things Is Changin' (1993) as Fred J. Eaglesmith & The Flying Squirrels  
 From The Paradise Motel (1994) as Fred J. Eaglesmith & The Flying Squirrels  
 Drive-In Movie (1996)
 Lipstick, Lies and Gasoline (1997)
 50 Odd Dollars (1999)
 Live: Ralph's Last Show (2001) as Fred Eaglesmith & The Flying Squirrels  
 Falling Stars and Broken Hearts (2002)
 The Official Bootleg Series Volume 1: Live Solo 2002 (2002) as Fred J. Eaglesmith
 Balin (2003) as Fred Eaglesmith & The Flathead Noodlers 
 The Official Bootleg Series Volume 2: The Fred Eaglesmith Texas Weekend 2004 (2004) as Fred J. Eaglesmith
 Dusty (2004)
 Milly's Cafe (2006)
 Tinderbox (2008)
 Cha Cha Cha (2010)
 6 Volts (2011)
 Tambourine (2013)
 Standard  (2017)
 Alive (2020, with Tif Ginn)

Singles
 Take It All Away / Caroline (1987) as Fred J. Eaglesmith; from Indiana Road
 Wooden Wheels in Hagersville (1990) as Fred J. Eaglesmith & The Flying Squirrels; single-only release
 Watertown (2017) from Standard

Other appearances
 Lucille (live), Live at the Iron Horse Vol. 1 (1997)
 White Trash (live in studio), WNCW 88.7 – Crowd Around The Mic Volume 2 (1998)
 Seven Shells (live in studio), Gzowski in Compilation (1999)
 Little Buffalo (live in studio), KNON 89.3 FM: Texas Renegade Radio Vol.2 – Live In The Studio (2000)
 Hallelujah, Go Tell It On The Mountain, CMT Christmas (2001)
 Freight Train (live), Fish Out Of Water 3: Out Of The Fire - Into The Air (2003)
 I Like Trains (live), Dawson City Music Festival 50.30 – A CBC Compilation (2008)
 Arthur Dale's Statement, Miners' Angel - A Tribute To Mother Jones (2015)

Filmography
 There Ain't No Easy Road (2005) Documentary DVD
 Pickin' In The Pines: Live At The 2005 Great Northern Picnic (2006) Concert DVD, as Fred Eaglesmith And The Flying Squirrels
 Live Below Sea Level (2007) Concert DVD recorded live with band in 2006
 The Small Beers Tour (2009) Concert DVD recorded live solo in 2005
 The Fred Eaglesmith Traveling Steam Show (2015) DVD including both concert and documentary footage

Music videos

References

External links
 
 
Fred Eaglesmith's Entire Discography at Project Opus
 Fred Eaglesmith in the Netherlands
Fred Eaglesmith at exclaim!

Canadian male singer-songwriters
Canadian country singer-songwriters
1957 births
Living people
Juno Award for Roots & Traditional Album of the Year – Solo winners
Signature Sounds artists
20th-century Canadian male singers
21st-century Canadian male singers
Canadian folk singer-songwriters
Canadian people of Dutch descent